The naming customs of  Indigenous Taiwanese are distinct from, though influenced by, the majority Han Chinese culture of Taiwan. Prior to contact with Han Chinese, the Indigenous Taiwanese named themselves according to each tribe's tradition. The naming system varies greatly depending on the particular tribes. Some tribes do not have family names, at least as part of the personal name.

Under the strong influence of Chinese culture and forces of cultural assimilation brought by Han settlers in the 17th century, the Indigenous Taiwanese have gradually adopted Han names. In the 17th and 18th centuries, possession of a Han surname was considered to be a sign of being civilized, in part because adoption of a Han surname meant that that person was now entered into the population registration books and could be taxed.  Upon possessing a Han surname, most of the lowland Indigenous tribes assimilated with the Han immigrants, and eventually no longer saw themselves or were seen as a distinct population.

The handful of highland tribes generally kept separate names until after World War II when the government systematically assigned Han names to Indigenous Taiwanese. Aboriginal Taiwanese people settled near Hakka communities were sometimes assigned Hakka-like family names. For instance, Indigenous pop singer A-mei (張惠妹) may have a name with Hakka characteristics.

For a few decades in the first half of the 20th century under Japanese rule, a strict policy was put in place to quickly assimilate the island's inhabitants en masse by instituting Japanese names. These names were generally abandoned in Taiwan after 1945 when Japanese rule ended.

In the last two decades some Indigenous Taiwanese people have again taken up traditional names or chosen to emphasize them. However, few have abandoned their Han names, in part because the Austronesian names are difficult for non-Indigenous people to remember or pronounce.  As a legacy of the anti-romanisation policy of the past, even these names are often written in Chinese characters to mimic their native sounds, even though Formosan languages are typically written in the Latin alphabet.

Indigenous names 
The naming rules of Indigenous Taiwanese:

Examples 
 Walis Yukan (瓦歷斯‧尤幹), Atayal, a famous aboriginal activist and poet.
 Walis Perin, Seediq, minister of the Council of Indigenous Peoples.
 Giwas Ali, Atayal name of Kao Chin Su-mei, a singer, actress and politician.
 Gulilai Amit, a.k.a. A-mei, an ethnic Puyuma pop singer.
 Attun Palalin, a.k.a. Teruo Nakamura, a Taiwan-born soldier of the Imperial Japanese Army who fought for Japan in World War II and did not surrender until 1974.

See also

 Chinese name
 Japanese name
 Korean name
 Vietnamese name
 List of Taiwan-related topics
 List of most common surnames
 Courtesy name
 Generation name

References
 Documentary on Aboriginal names, in Chinese

External links 
 Indigenous People Regain Their Names
 Chinese name generator (in Chinese, generates names that are statistically similar to Taiwan's general population)
 Top 10 family names in Taiwan (in Chinese)

Name lists
These names are mostly male names and they belong to Taiwanese people of the past one to two hundred years. Most of these are not Taiwanese names and are indistinguishable from Chinese names.
 Ministry of Education's Scholarship Awards winners
 36 historically important persons of Chiayi County
 A list of Taiwanese poets
 A list of early 20th-century school teachers who worked at a Chiayi County elementary school

Taiwanese aborigines
Taiwanese aboriginal culture and history